Juan III is the name of:

 John of Aragon (patriarch) (1304–1334), archbishop of Toledo under the name Juan III
 Infante Juan, Count of Montizón (1822–1887)
 Infante Juan, Count of Barcelona (1913–1993), third surviving son and designated heir of King Alfonso XIII of Spain and Victoria Eugenie of Battenberg